Rick Muther (August 13, 1935 in Alhambra, California – March 12, 1995) was an American racing driver.

Biography
He was for the most part The Indy 500's first hippy race driver. Muther started in SCCA sports car racing in Southern California at Riverside winning the prestigious Tim Mayer award. He drove in the USAC and CART Championship Car series, racing in the 1967-1975 USAC and 1980 CART seasons, with 46 combined career starts, including the Indianapolis 500 in 1970-1971 and 1974 and finished in the top ten 13 times. A highlight of Rick's career was racing for four-time Indy winner A. J. Foyt in the 1975 California 500. Eventually, Foyt hired another teammate, fearing he would be beaten by Muther. Muther's best Indy car finishes were in 5th position in 1968 at Riverside and in 1972 at Milwaukee. He was considered a very capable racing driver and was respected by his peers even though he was not a front-runner. 

One of Indy's all-time most colorful drivers, Muther always had the wildest helmet paint jobs by Gary Finoe, a disciple of Von Dutch. Muther's attire was wild Kelly Mouse design flying eyeball clothing. Muther had many friends in the California music and art scene. A proud "double Leo", he often incorporated Lions in his helmet designs. Muther died of heart failure in his sleep, in San Juan, Washington.

Complete motorsports results

American Open-Wheel racing results
(key) (Races in bold indicate pole position, races in italics indicate fastest race lap)

SCCA National Championship Runoffs

Indy 500 results

References

1935 births
1995 deaths
American racing drivers
Indianapolis 500 drivers
Can-Am entrants
Champ Car drivers
Sportspeople from Alhambra, California
Racing drivers from California
Racing drivers from Los Angeles
SCCA National Championship Runoffs winners
USAC Silver Crown Series drivers

A. J. Foyt Enterprises drivers